George M. Woodwell (born October 23, 1928) is an American ecologist. He founded several programs in ecology, first at Brookhaven National Laboratory then at the Marine Biological Laboratory in Woods Hole, Massachusetts, and then at the Woods Hole Research Center, which he founded in 1985. (Now known as Woodwell Climate Research Center). 

He is best known for his work on the effects of ionizing radiation on forest ecosystems, his work to have the pesticide DDT banned from use in the United States, and his work to call attention to the threat of climate change as a result of combustion of fossil fuels. Woodwell was one of the first scientists to sound the alarm about climate change, testifying before Congress about climate change impacts in 1986.

He saw a role for science in environmental policy. In the early 1970s he worked with colleagues in the law to help launch the  national environmental organizations that continue to blend science and law in defense of the environment. He was a founding board member of the Environmental Defense Fund (a direct result of his work with others on DDT on Long Island, NY), and the Natural Resources Defense Council, on whose board he served for 50 years. He also served a chair of the World Wildlife Fund (US). He is author/editor of several books and author of hundreds of scientific papers. He is a member of the American Academy of Arts and Sciences and a member of the National Academy of Sciences.

In 1997 he was awarded the 3rd Annual Heinz Award in the Environment  and in 2001 he was awarded the Volvo Environment Prize.

Life
Woodwell was born in Cambridge, Massachusetts to parents who were educators: Philip McIntire Woodwell and Virginia Sellers. He spent his childhood summers on family farm in Maine. He attended the Boston Public Latin School and completed his bachelor's degree in biology in 1950 at Dartmouth College, New Hampshire. He served as an Ensign Lt. Jg in the US Navy Fromm 1950-1953. He holds a masters degree and a PhD in Botany from Duke University. His first job was as professor of Botany at the University of Maine.

Research and Significance
In a seminal experiment at Brookhaven National Laboratory, Woodwell placed a source of ionizing radiation (cesium) at the center of an Oak-Pine Forest and, over the course of ten years, documented the changes in structure and function of the forest plants. He concluded what is now widely-accepted, that organisms with the most sophisticated structure will die first when exposed to chronic stress. Simpler organisms are more resilient to chronic stress. He extrapolated to posit that the results he found in the Long Island forest ecosystem were also true of the global ecosystem: that natural systems will degrade in a predictable pattern when exposed to chronic stress. 

His research on pesticides focused on DDT where he and fellow scientists were among the first to warn of the harmful effects of DDT on wildlife. That work helped lead to a ban on the use of DDT in the US. It was this group of scientists and lawyers who established the Environmental Defense Fund as a result of their work on DDT.

Woodwell has done extensive research on carbon budgeting in North American forests and estuaries. He was among the first to recognize that climate change created a positive feedback system: that the warming fed the warming, threatening an increase in the pace of climate change over time. Under his leadership the Woods Hole Research Center developed climate research programs around the world, including in the Amazon Basin, the Arctic, Cape Cod, and a program to map the decline of forests worldwide, using satellite imagery. He and his staff were instrumental in producing the Framework Convention on Climate Change in 1992, which was approved by 92 countries at the Rio Climate Summit.

References

American environmentalists
Living people
Members of the United States National Academy of Sciences
1928 births
Fellows of the Ecological Society of America